The 1995 San Jose State Spartans football team represented San Jose State University during the 1995 NCAA Division I-A football season as a member of the Big West Conference. The team was led by head coach John Ralston, in his third year as head coach at San Jose State. They played home games at Spartan Stadium in San Jose, California. The Spartans finished the 1995 season with a record of three wins and eight losses (3–8, 3–4 Big West).

Schedule

Game Summaries

Stanford

at No. 7 USC

Northern Illinois

at California

at Utah State

UNLV

at San Diego State

Pacific (CA)

at Arkansas State

at New Mexico State

at Nevada

Team players in the NFL
The following were selected in the 1996 NFL Draft.

Notes

References

San Jose State
San Jose State Spartans football seasons
San Jose State Spartans football